Puente de Piedra is a district of the Grecia canton, in the Alajuela province of Costa Rica.

History 
Puente de Piedra was created on 22 April 1932 by Acuerdo 609 .

Geography 
Puente de Piedra has an area of  km² and an elevation of  metres.

Demographics 

For the 2011 census, Puente de Piedra had a population of  inhabitants.

Transportation

Road transportation 
The district is covered by the following road routes:
 National Route 1
 National Route 118
 National Route 154
 National Route 716
 National Route 717

References 

Districts of Alajuela Province
Populated places in Alajuela Province